Gobibatyr colossus is a moth in the family Cossidae. It is found in Mongolia (Tien-Schan).

References

Natural History Museum Lepidoptera generic names catalog

Cossinae
Moths described in 1887
Moths of Asia